Wang Xudong (born February 1967) is a Chinese researcher and curator of the Palace Museum since 8 April 2019. Previously he served as director of Dunhuang Research Academy. He is an alternate member of the 19th Central Committee of the Chinese Communist Party.

Biography
Wang was born in Shandan County, Zhangye, Gansu, in 1967. After graduating from Shandan No. 1 High School in July 1986, he entered Lanzhou University, where he majored in hydrogeology and engineering geology. After university, he briefly worked in a hydropower station in his home-city Zhangye. In June 1991 he joined the Dunhuang Research Academy, and was appointed its 4th director in December 2014. On April 8, 2019, he replaced Shan Jixiang to become director of the Palace Museum.

References

1967 births
Living people
Lanzhou University alumni
Directors of museums in China
Chinese Communist Party politicians from Jiangsu
Alternate members of the 19th Central Committee of the Chinese Communist Party